José Ricardo Devaca Sánchez (born 18 September 1982) is a Paraguayan former footballer who last played for Banfield of the Argentine Primera División.

Club career
Devaca started his career at Cerro Porteño in 2000. In 2001, he moved to Italy to play for Udinese, before returning to Paraguay to play again for Cerro Porteño in 2002. That same year, he moved to Argentina to play for Lorenzo, before moving back to Paraguay in 2003 for a third spell at Cerro Porteño. In 2004, he once again moved to Italy and Udinese, returning again to Paraguay in 2005, this time to play for Libertad. In 2006, he had a fourth spell at Cerro Porteño, before moving to Argentina again, to play for Godoy Cruz. In 2007, he moved to Banfield where he was part of the squad that won the Apertura 2009 championship, helping Banfield to win the Argentine league championship for the first time in its history.

International career
Devaca made his senior international debut on July 24 at the age of 21.8 years. Devaca was a member of the Paraguayan squad at the 2001 FIFA World Youth Championship and part of the silver medal-winning Paraguayan football team at the 2004 Summer Olympics. On 4 August, before the Summer Olympics began, he played in a preparation game against the Portugal of Cristiano Ronaldo in the city of Algarve, resulting in a 5–0 defeat.

Honours
Banfield
Primera División Argentina: Apertura 2009

References

External links
 Argentine Primera statistics

1982 births
Living people
People from Capiatá
Paraguayan footballers
Paraguay under-20 international footballers
Paraguay international footballers
Cerro Porteño players
Udinese Calcio players
San Lorenzo de Almagro footballers
Club Libertad footballers
Godoy Cruz Antonio Tomba footballers
Club Atlético Banfield footballers
Paraguayan Primera División players
Argentine Primera División players
2004 Copa América players
Paraguayan expatriate footballers
Expatriate footballers in Argentina
Paraguayan expatriate sportspeople in Italy
Expatriate footballers in Italy
Olympic footballers of Paraguay
Footballers at the 2004 Summer Olympics
Olympic silver medalists for Paraguay
Olympic medalists in football
Club Rubio Ñu footballers
Medalists at the 2004 Summer Olympics
Association football defenders